Michael, Micky or Mike Burton may refer to:

Michael Burton (diplomat) (born 1937), British diplomat
Michael Burton (judge) (born 1946), judge of the High Court of England and Wales
Michael Burton (American football) (born 1992), NFL player
Michael Burton (psychologist), psychologist and professor at the University of York
Michael G. Burton, Northern Irish astronomer
Micky Burton (born 1969), English professional footballer
Mike Burton (politician) (born 1941), American politician in Oregon
Mike Burton (rugby union) (born 1945), former English rugby union footballer
Mike Burton (swimmer) (born 1947), American swimmer 
Mike Burton (cricketer) (born 1944), Zimbabwean cricketer
Michael Burton (politician), Missouri politician and former actor

See also